Kunihiro Ohta (born 22 April 1931) is a Japanese former equestrian. He competed at the 1956 Summer Olympics and the 1960 Summer Olympics.

References

External links
 

1931 births
Possibly living people
Japanese male equestrians
Olympic equestrians of Japan
Equestrians at the 1956 Summer Olympics
Equestrians at the 1960 Summer Olympics
Sportspeople from Tokyo